Richard Allen Jefferson Jr. (born June 21, 1980) is an American former professional basketball player who is a sports analyst on ESPN. He played college basketball with the Arizona Wildcats. Jefferson was drafted in the first round of the 2001 NBA draft with the 13th overall pick , and was named to the NBA All-Rookie Second Team in his first season with the New Jersey Nets (now known as the Brooklyn Nets). He won an NBA championship with the Cleveland Cavaliers in 2016. He was also a member of the United States national team that won a bronze medal in the 2004 Summer Olympics.

Jefferson retired from playing in 2018, becoming a basketball analyst.

Early life
Jefferson was born in Los Angeles and was raised in Phoenix. His mother and step-father were both Christian missionaries, and he moved around frequently growing up. He attended Moon Valley High School in West Phoenix, where he was an integral part of the varsity basketball team that won the 4A State Championship in 1998.

College career
Jefferson played college basketball at the University of Arizona, under Hall of Fame coach Lute Olson from 1998 to 2001. During his 84-game career (77 starts), Jefferson averaged 11.2 points, 5.0 rebounds and 2.8 assists per game. He capped his career by being part of the Arizona team that advanced to the 2001 national championship game where the Wildcats fell to Duke. Along the way, Jefferson was an all-Midwest Regional and all-Final Four selection. He was inducted into the Pac-12 Basketball Hall of Honor during the 2012 Pac-12 Conference men's basketball tournament, March 10, 2012.

Professional career

New Jersey Nets (2001–2008)
Jefferson played seven seasons with the New Jersey Nets and was a key element of their back-to-back Eastern Conference Championship teams of 2002 and 2003. In addition, Jefferson was a member of the USA Men's Olympic basketball team in the 2004 Summer Olympics. Jefferson competed in the NBA Slam Dunk Contest in 2003.

Jefferson began his career as a substitute small forward for Keith Van Horn and showed great defensive skills and all-around ability. Because of his potential, and Van Horn's conflict with power forward Kenyon Martin, the Nets traded Van Horn to the Philadelphia 76ers and trusted Jefferson as a starter. Jefferson blossomed in the role, becoming a good mid- and long-range shooter in addition to his slashing ability. On August 13, 2004, Jefferson signed a six-year, $78,000,000 contract extension with the Nets.

Jefferson missed the majority of the 2004–05 regular season after rupturing a ligament in his left wrist, an injury he claimed occurred when Detroit Pistons guard Chauncey Billups purposely undercut him on a layup attempt during a game on December 27, 2004. Jefferson ended up missing 49 games, but returned to action for the first round of the playoffs against the Miami Heat. Prior to suffering the injury, he had missed only five games in his three NBA seasons. Jefferson had been enjoying his best professional season, averaging 22.2 points, 7.3 rebounds, and 4.0 assists per game. Through the 2005–06 season, Jefferson continued to perform at a high level and established himself as one of the NBA's most versatile players. On January 21, 2007, Jefferson decided to have ankle surgery. After missing around six weeks, he was back in the lineup. His absence proved to be a major setback for the struggling Nets, who surged back into playoff contention once Jefferson returned.

In August 2007, Jefferson pledged $3.5 million toward the University of Arizona's then-planned basketball and volleyball practice facility, which was eventually named in his honor.

Jefferson started the 2007–08 season in the best form of his NBA career. In the first 7 games, he averaged 26.9 points, 5.6 rebounds and 2.4 assists, while also notching up 1.3 steals, 97.1% in free-throws and 49.1% in field-goals. On October 31, in a game against the Chicago Bulls, Jefferson injured his right wrist slightly, thumping his chest following a clutch three-pointer. The Nets went on to win the game in overtime. On December 4 he passed Kerry Kittles to become the Nets' second all-time leading scorer.

Milwaukee Bucks (2008–2009)
On June 26, 2008, Jefferson was traded to the Milwaukee Bucks for Yi Jianlian and future teammate Bobby Simmons. He was not happy with the trade at first because he planned on being a Net until retirement. However, he later expressed enthusiasm about playing alongside Michael Redd.

San Antonio Spurs (2009–2011)

On June 23, 2009, Richard Jefferson was traded to the San Antonio Spurs for Bruce Bowen, Kurt Thomas, and Fabricio Oberto. On June 30, 2010 Jefferson opted out of his contract with San Antonio and became an unrestricted free agent. On July 23, 2010, Jefferson re-signed with the Spurs.

Golden State Warriors (2012–2013)
On March 15, 2012, the Golden State Warriors traded the newly acquired Stephen Jackson for Jefferson, along with a conditional first-round pick.

Utah Jazz (2013–2014)
On July 5, 2013, the Warriors reportedly agreed to trade Jefferson, along with teammates Brandon Rush and Andris Biedriņš, as well as two first round picks and two second round picks, to the Utah Jazz in a three team deal, in which they received Andre Iguodala from the Denver Nuggets. The trade became official on July 10.

Dallas Mavericks (2014–2015)
On July 21, 2014, Jefferson signed with the Dallas Mavericks.
He was the last Maverick to wear #24 before it was retired in honor of Kobe Bryant.

Cleveland Cavaliers (2015–2017)
On August 5, 2015, Jefferson signed with the Cleveland Cavaliers. On October 27, he made his debut for the team, posting ten points, one assist, and one steal in a 95–97 loss to the Chicago Bulls. The Cavaliers finished the regular season with a 57–25 record and reached the 2016 NBA Finals with a 12–2 playoff record. In the third Finals of his career, Jefferson played in every game of the series, including two starts in place of the injured Kevin Love. In Game 3, Jefferson gave the Cavaliers a boost in 33 minutes, scoring nine points with eight rebounds as the Cavaliers cut the Golden State Warriors' advantage in the series to 2–1 with a 120–90 win. Despite falling into a 3–1 deficit, the Cavaliers completed the historic comeback to take the series in seven games, winning Jefferson his first championship.

After initially considering retirement following the championship win, Jefferson re-signed with the Cavaliers on July 28, 2016, reportedly on a two-year, $5 million contract. The Cavaliers returned to the NBA Finals in 2017, but fell short in their quest for back-to-back titles, losing in five games to the Warriors. In his final game with the Cavaliers, Jefferson logged four points and two rebounds in a 120–129 loss to the Warriors.

On October 14, 2017, Jefferson was traded, along with Kay Felder, two future second-round draft picks and cash considerations, to the Atlanta Hawks in exchange for the rights to Sergiy Gladyr and Dimitrios Agravanis. He was immediately waived by the Hawks.

Denver Nuggets (2017–2018)
On October 19, 2017, Jefferson signed a one-year, $2.3 million contract with the Denver Nuggets.

On October 13, 2018, Jefferson announced his retirement from professional basketball.

Broadcasting career

On October 16, 2018, Jefferson joined the YES Network as the Nets' game and studio analyst. He also appears as a basketball analyst on FS1, ESPN, and the Pac-12 Network.

During the 2017 season, Jefferson began co-hosting the podcast Road Trippin' alongside former Cavaliers sideline reporter and Lakers host Allie Clifton and teammate and close friend Channing Frye. Many of the podcast's first shows featured Jefferson's Cavs teammates and were recorded while on road trips.

Personal life
Jefferson dated dancer and cheerleader Kesha Ni'cole Nichols for five years. Jefferson and Nichols were engaged to be married on two occasions, but Jefferson broke off the engagement both times. The couple was scheduled to be married on July 11, 2009 at the Mandarin Oriental; however, Jefferson called off the wedding the night before it was scheduled to occur.

On July 11, 2022, the NBA announced that Jefferson would be a referee for the second quarter of the Knicks-Blazers game at the 2022 NBA Summer League.

NBA career statistics

Regular season

|-
| style="text-align:left;"|
| style="text-align:left;"|New Jersey
| 79 || 9 || 24.3 || .457 || .232 || .713 || 3.7 || 1.8 || .8 || .6 || 9.4
|-
| style="text-align:left;"|
| style="text-align:left;"|New Jersey
| 80 || 80 || 36.0 || .501 || .250 || .743 || 6.4 || 2.5 || 1.0 || .6 || 15.5
|-
| style="text-align:left;"|
| style="text-align:left;"|New Jersey
| 82 || 82 || 38.2 || .498 || .364 || .763 || 5.7 || 3.8 || 1.1 || .3 || 18.5
|-
| style="text-align:left;"|
| style="text-align:left;"|New Jersey
| 33 || 33 || 41.1 || .422 || .337 || .844 || 7.3 || 4.0 || 1.0 || .5 || 22.2
|-
| style="text-align:left;"|
| style="text-align:left;"|New Jersey
| 78 || 78 || 39.2 || .493 || .319 || .812 || 6.8 || 3.8 || .8 || .2 || 19.5
|-
| style="text-align:left;"|
| style="text-align:left;"|New Jersey
| 55 || 53 || 35.6 || .456 || .359 || .733 || 4.4 || 2.7 || .6 || .1 || 16.3
|-
| style="text-align:left;"|
| style="text-align:left;"|New Jersey
| 82 || 82 || 39.0 || .466 || .362 || .798 || 4.2 || 3.1 || .9 || .3 || 22.6
|-
| style="text-align:left;"|
| style="text-align:left;"|Milwaukee
| 82 || 82 || 35.8 || .439 || .397 || .805 || 4.6 || 2.4 || .8 || .2 || 19.6
|-
| style="text-align:left;"|
| style="text-align:left;"|San Antonio
| 81 || 70 || 31.1 || .467 || .316 || .735 || 4.4 || 2.0 || .6 || .5 || 12.3
|-
| style="text-align:left;"|
| style="text-align:left;"|San Antonio
| 81 || 81 || 30.4 || .474 || .440 || .750 || 3.8 || 1.3 || .5 || .4 || 11.0
|-
| style="text-align:left;"|
| style="text-align:left;"|San Antonio
| 41 || 41 || 28.5 || .414 || .421 || .700 || 3.5 || 1.3 || .6 || .3 || 9.2
|-
| style="text-align:left;"|
| style="text-align:left;"|Golden State
| 22 || 3 || 26.4 || .420 || .418 || .686 || 3.5 || 1.5 || .5 || .3 || 9.0
|-
| style="text-align:left;"|
| style="text-align:left;"|Golden State
| 56 || 1 || 10.1 || .456 || .311 || .717 || 1.5 || .6 || .3 || .1 || 3.1
|-
| style="text-align:left;"|
| style="text-align:left;"|Utah
| 82 || 78 || 27.0 || .450 || .409 || .741 || 2.7 || 1.6 || .7 || .2 || 10.1
|-
| style="text-align:left;"|
| style="text-align:left;"|Dallas
| 74 || 18 || 16.8 || .444 || .426 || .684 || 2.5 || .8 || .4 || .1 || 5.8
|-
| style="text-align:left; background:#afe6ba;"|†
| style="text-align:left;"|Cleveland
| 74 || 5 || 17.9 || .458 || .382|| .667 || 1.7 || .8 || .4 || .2 || 5.5
|-
| style="text-align:left;"|
| style="text-align:left;"|Cleveland
| 79 || 13 || 20.4 || .446 || .333 || .741 || 2.6 || 1.0 || .3 || .1 || 5.7
|-
| style="text-align:left;"|
| style="text-align:left;"|Denver
| 20 || 0 || 8.2 || .444 || .286 || .571 || .9 || .8 || .1 || .1 || 1.5
|- class="sortbottom"
| style="text-align:center;" colspan="2"|Career
| 1181 || 809 || 29.0 || .464 || .376 || .768 || 4.0 || 2.0 || .7 || .3 || 12.6

Playoffs

|-
| style="text-align:left;"|2002
| style="text-align:left;"|New Jersey
| 20 || 0 || 22.1 || .465 || .000 || .550 || 4.6 || 1.3 || .6 || .5 || 7.0
|-
| style="text-align:left;"|2003
| style="text-align:left;"|New Jersey
| 20 || 20 || 35.6 || .476 || .000 || .718 || 6.4 || 2.4 || .8 || .2 || 14.1
|-
| style="text-align:left;"|2004
| style="text-align:left;"|New Jersey
| 11 || 11 || 41.8 || .418 || .273 || .713 || 6.3 || 3.8 || 1.3 || .7 || 19.8
|-
| style="text-align:left;"|2005
| style="text-align:left;"|New Jersey
| 4 || 1 || 35.0 || .400 || .200 || .677 || 5.5 || 2.3 || .8 || .0 || 15.8
|-
| style="text-align:left;"|2006
| style="text-align:left;"|New Jersey
| 11 || 11 || 39.7 || .545 || .414 || .825 || 4.1 || 4.1 || .9 || .4 || 22.2
|-
| style="text-align:left;"|2007
| style="text-align:left;"|New Jersey
| 12 || 12 || 40.8 || .482 || .325 || .924 || 5.6 || 2.3 || .8 || .4 || 19.7
|-
| style="text-align:left;"|2010
| style="text-align:left;"|San Antonio
| 10 || 10 || 33.4 || .486 || .200 || .758 || 5.3 || 1.8 || .6 || .6 || 9.4
|-
| style="text-align:left;"|2011
| style="text-align:left;"|San Antonio
| 6 || 6 || 29.3 || .387 || .353 || .818 || 4.2 || .8 || .5 || .5 || 6.5
|-
| style="text-align:left;"|2013
| style="text-align:left;"|Golden State
| 7 || 0 || 5.6 || .444 || .667 || .333 || 1.0 || .1 || .1 || .1 || 1.9
|-
| style="text-align:left;"|2015
| style="text-align:left;"|Dallas
| 4 || 2 || 12.8 || .357 || .375 || 1.000 || .5 || .3 || .5 || .0 || 3.8
|-
| style="text-align:left; background:#afe6ba;"|2016†
| style="text-align:left;"|Cleveland
| 21 || 2 || 18.1 || .524 || .393 || .750 || 3.5 || .7 || .5 || .0 || 5.4
|-
| style="text-align:left;"|2017
| style="text-align:left;"|Cleveland
| 14 || 0 || 12.8 || .421 || .263 || .643 || 1.8 || .5 || .1 || .2 || 3.9
|- class="sortbottom"
| style="text-align:center;" colspan="2"|Career
| 140 || 75 || 27.4 || .473 || .325 || .731 || 4.3 || 1.7 || .6 || .3 || 10.8

References

External links

1980 births
Living people
African-American basketball players
American men's basketball players
Arizona Wildcats men's basketball players
Basketball players at the 2004 Summer Olympics
Basketball players from Phoenix, Arizona
Basketball players from Los Angeles
Brooklyn Nets announcers
Cleveland Cavaliers players
College basketball announcers in the United States
Dallas Mavericks players
Denver Nuggets players
Golden State Warriors players
Houston Rockets draft picks
McDonald's High School All-Americans
Medalists at the 2004 Summer Olympics
Milwaukee Bucks players
New Jersey Nets players
Olympic bronze medalists for the United States in basketball
Parade High School All-Americans (boys' basketball)
San Antonio Spurs players
Small forwards
Sportspeople from Phoenix, Arizona
United States men's national basketball team players
Utah Jazz players
African-American sports journalists
African-American television personalities
ESPN people
21st-century American journalists
Sportspeople from Los Angeles